Nader Charbel Matar (born 12 May 1992) is a professional footballer who plays as a midfielder for  club Ansar and the Lebanon national team.

Matar began his senior career in 2008 in Portugal, playing for Sporting CP B and Oeiras. He moved to Spain in 2010, where he played for Atlético Madrid C and Canillas, before moving to Ghana-based Asante Kotoko in 2012. He returning to Portugal in 2014, playing six months at Beira-Mar. Matar signed for his first Lebanese club in 2016, Nejmeh, where he won three Lebanese Elite Cups and one Lebanese Super Cup in his four-year stay. In 2020, Matar moved to cross-city rivals Ansar, helping them win their first league title in 14 years in his first season. He then moved back abroad, joining Qatar-based Muaither, before returning to Ansar in 2022.

Born in the Ivory Coast to a Lebanese father and a Moroccan mother, Matar chose to represent Lebanon internationally. He made his debut in a friendly against Iraq in 2012, and also played in the 2014 FIFA World Cup qualifiers. Matar helped Lebanon qualify to the 2019 AFC Asian Cup, where he played. His first goal came at the 2019 WAFF Championship, against Syria.

Early life
Matar was born in Abidjan, Ivory Coast, to a Lebanese father and Moroccan mother. He grew up in Angola, and played for several local clubs.

Club career

Early career 
After playing at youth level for Alcorcón in Spain, in 2008 Matar moved to Portugal, playing one year for Sporting CP B, and one year for Oeiras. He returned to Spain in 2010, joining Atlético Madrid C, before moving to Canillas, Real Madrid's de facto C team.

Matar signed for Ghana Premier League side Asante Kotoko in 2012. In 2014 he returned to Portugal, at Beira-Mar in the Liga Portugal 2, where he was released after six months.

Nejmeh 
On 2 September 2016, Matar moved to Lebanon and signed for Nejmeh. He scored one goal in 17 league games in 2016–17, helping his team win the Lebanese Super Cup and Lebanese Elite Cup. He was included in the Lebanese Premier League Team of the Year. In 2017–18 Matar improved his tally, scoring four in 19, winning the Lebanese Elite Cup once again. He renewed his contract for an additional season on 28 March 2018.

The following season, in 2018–19, Matar scored three goals in 20 games, and helped Nejmeh win the Lebanese Elite Cup for the third time in a row. He renewed his contract for three more years on 21 March 2019. On 25 October 2019, Matar was warned and fined by Nejmeh for throwing his kit on the floor following a substitution against Racing Beirut in a friendly. On 20 January 2020, Matar's contract was terminated by mutual consent following financial disputes between the two parties.

Ansar 
Matar joined cross-city rivals Ansar on 21 September 2020. In 2020–21, he helped them win their first league title since 2007, and their 14th overall. Matar scored two goals and made three assists in 14 games. He also helped Ansar win the double, scoring a long-distance goal against Nejmeh in the 2020–21 Lebanese FA Cup final, which Ansar won on penalty shoot-outs.

Muaither 
On 16 August 2021, Matar moved to Qatari Second Division side Muaither on a free transfer. He made his debut on 15 September, in a 1–0 defeat to Lusalil.

Return to Ansar 
On 17 January 2022, Matar returned to Ansar in the Lebanese Premier League, signing a contract until the end of the 2021–22 season.

International career 

Matar made his debut for Lebanon in a 1–0 home win against Iraq in a friendly on 22 January 2012. He was called up for the 2019 AFC Asian Cup squad, playing in all three group stage games. Matar's first international goal came on 2 August 2019, in a 2–1 win against Syria at the 2019 WAFF Championship.

Style of play 
An attacking-minded midfielder, Matar's main characteristics are his dribbling and flair; he is also a set-piece specialist. Starting out as an attacking midfielder, Matar developed into a more central role during his stay at Nejmeh.

Personal life 
On 9 January 2021, Matar married a Moroccan woman in Casablanca, Morocco.

Career statistics

International 

Scores and results list Lebanon's goal tally first, score column indicates score after each Matar goal.

Honours 
Asante Kotoko
 Ghana Premier League: 2011–12, 2012–13, 2013–14
 Ghanaian FA Cup: 2014
 Ghana Super Cup: 2012, 2013

Nejmeh
 Lebanese Super Cup: 2016
 Lebanese Elite Cup: 2016, 2017, 2018

Ansar
 Lebanese Premier League: 2020–21
 Lebanese FA Cup: 2020–21; runner-up: 2021–22
 Lebanese Elite Cup runner-up: 2022

Individual
 Lebanese Premier League Team of the Season: 2016–17

See also
 List of Lebanon international footballers
 List of Lebanon international footballers born outside Lebanon

References

External links

 
 
 
 

1992 births
Living people
Footballers from Abidjan
Lebanese people of Moroccan descent
Moroccan people of Lebanese descent
Sportspeople of Moroccan descent
Sportspeople of Lebanese descent
Lebanese footballers
Association football midfielders
Sporting CP B players
AD Oeiras players
Atlético Madrid C players
CD Canillas players
Asante Kotoko S.C. players
S.C. Beira-Mar players
Nejmeh SC players
Al Ansar FC players
Muaither SC players
Ghana Premier League players
Liga Portugal 2 players
Lebanese Premier League players
Qatari Second Division players
Lebanon international footballers
2019 AFC Asian Cup players
Lebanese expatriate footballers
Expatriate footballers in Angola
Expatriate footballers in Portugal
Expatriate footballers in Spain
Expatriate footballers in Ghana
Expatriate footballers in Qatar
Lebanese expatriate sportspeople in Angola
Lebanese expatriate sportspeople in Portugal
Lebanese expatriate sportspeople in Spain
Lebanese expatriate sportspeople in Ghana
Lebanese expatriate sportspeople in Qatar